Old Billingsgate Market is the name given to what is now a hospitality and events venue in the City of London, based in the Victorian building that was originally Billingsgate Fish Market, the world's largest fish market in the 19th century.

The first Billingsgate Market building was constructed on Lower Thames Street in 1850 by the builder John Jay, and the fish market was moved off the streets into its new riverside building. This was demolished in around 1873 and replaced by an arcaded market hall designed by City architect Horace Jones and built by John Mowlem & Co. in 1875, the building that still stands on the site today.

In 1982, the fish market itself was relocated to a new site on the Isle of Dogs in east London. The 1875 building was then refurbished by architect Richard Rogers, originally to provide office accommodation.

Now used as an events venue, it remains a major London landmark and a notable Grade II listed building.

Gallery

References

External links
Official website

Commercial buildings completed in 1875
Grade II listed buildings in the City of London
History of the City of London
Former retail markets in London
1850 establishments in England

no:Billingsgate Market